Asian Film Award for Best Film has been awarded annually since 2007 by the Hong Kong International Film Festival Society.

Winners and nominees

2000s

2010s

2020s

References

External links
 Official site

Asian Film Awards
 
Asia Film Award
Awards for best Asian film